The Changchun Tram is a historic tram line in Changchun, Jilin, China. It was first opened November 11, 1941, and was constructed by the Manchukuo government. On August 15, 1945, the tram had 7 lines and 73 trains. At its peak in 1960, the tram had 6 lines and 88 trains covering almost 53 km.

Since the 2000s there was only one line—Line No. 54—it is 7.6 km long going from Xi'an Road to Gongnong Road (Hongqi Street). In 2014, a new line named No. 55 opened. It runs from Hongqi Street to just outside Changchun West Railway Station.

See also
Changchun Rail Transit
Changchun

External links
Changchun Tram from People's Daily (Chinese)
Trams Changchun  (English, pictures, map)

Transport in Changchun
Changchun